Cecile of Baux (1230–1275), was a Countess Consort of Savoy; married in 1244 to Amadeus IV, Count of Savoy. She was the daughter of Barral of Baux and his wife, Sibylle d'Anduze. She was the Regent of Savoy during the minority of her son, Boniface, Count of Savoy, from 1253 until 1259.

Family and Issue
On 18 December 1244 she married Amadeus as his second wife.  They had 4 children:
 Boniface, Count of Savoy
 Beatrice of Savoy (1250 – 23 February 1292) married Peter of Chalon and Manuel of Castile, Lord of Villena.
 Eleonor of Savoy, married in 1269 Guichard de Beaujeu
 Constance of Savoy, died after 1263

Regency
A year before her husband died, he wrote a will which specified that his brother, Thomas and Cecile would act as regents for Boniface, the heir to the County of Savoy.  When Thomas died in 1259, Cecile continued as regent in Savoy.  In this role, one of her first acts was to relieve St-Germain-sur-Séez from various taxes in exchange for their work to guide travelers through the pass of Petit-St-Bernard.  As regent, she had her own seal for authorizing documents.  Under her regency, Boniface's uncles, Peter II and Philip I continued their practice of acquiring territories and influence in surrounding regions in the name of the count.

References

13th-century births
1275 deaths
Countesses of Savoy
13th-century women rulers
Burials at Hautecombe Abbey